Davide Tiso (born 21 June 1979) is a guitarist, composer and multi-instrumentalist. He originates from Padova, in Italy, but currently resides in San Francisco, California. He is a member of extreme metal band Ephel Duath, a band he started in 1998.

Outside of Ephel Duath, he has recorded with The Karyn Crisis Band (of whom the two were married) and with guitarist Eraldo Bernocchi on the Parched project, releasing a CD of music of "long, barren, pensive, delicate, touching, harrowing road open to only those who know what they should say, yet decide to mutter no word at all". He more recently recorded as a project called 'Manuscripts Don't Burn', a solo project using material written from the Karyn Crisis Band. as well as collaborating with Karyn on an Aborym album. Davide continued writing and recording with Ephel Duath in 2012 as a complete band, after signing the band with Agonia Records, and released Hemmed By Light, Shaped By Darkness in late 2013.

In March 2015, he collaborated with Karyn Crysis to release the album Gospel Of The Witches., and to date, he is a member of Niō and Howling Sycamore, with Watchtower vocalist Jason McMaster, who released their debut album in December 2017. In mid 2018, Davide became a member of the San Francisco metal band Botanist.

Discography

with Ephel Duath

Demo
 Opera (1998)
Studio albums
 Phormula (2000)
 Rephormula (2002)
 The Painter's Palette (2003)
 Pain Necessary to Know (2005)
 Through My Dog's Eyes (2009)
 Hemmed By Light, Shaped By Darkness (2013)
EP
 On Death and Cosmos (2012)
Remix albums
 Pain Remixes the Known (2007, electro-dub version of "Pain Necessary To Know" produced by Eraldo Bernocchi with Lorenzo Esposito Fornasari)

with Parched

 Arc (2009)

with Manuscripts Don't Burn

 The Breathing House (2010)

with Karyn Crysis

 Gospel Of The Witches (2015)

with Howling Sycamore

 Howling Sycamore (2017)

Other appearances

 Sigillum S – 23/20 (2007) 
 Nio

References 
https://nioband.bandcamp.com/

Hardcore techno musicians
Italian guitarists
Italian male guitarists
Living people
1979 births
Seven-string guitarists
21st-century guitarists
21st-century Italian male musicians